Silver Lake is a lake located in Clinton County, New York in the Adirondack Park. Silver Lake Mountain and the hamlet of Hawkeye, New York are located on the northeast shores of the lake. The northern and eastern shores of the lake contain many private camps, while the southern and western shores are forever wild.

References

Adirondack Park
Lakes of Clinton County, New York